Nierembergia scoparia is a species of plant in the family Solanaceae.

It goes by the common name cupflower or tall cupflower. The species is an herbaceous perennial native to Argentina, Brazil, and Uruguay. It can grow up to 2.5 feet high. Flowers are up to an inch wide and pale blue.

The species is used as a garden plant. Cultivars have been bred to have darker purple coloration in their flowers.

References

Further reading

Petunioideae
Perennial plants
Garden plants of South America
Taxa named by Otto Sendtner
Plants described in 1846